Gać is a village in the administrative district of Gmina Oława, within Oława County, Lower Silesian Voivodeship, in southwestern Poland. Prior to 1945 it was a part of Germany.

References

Villages in Oława County